Ligao, officially the City of Ligao, is a 4th class component city in the province of Albay, Philippines. According to the 2020 census, it has a population of 118,096 people. Most of the city's economy came from agriculture sector.

Etymology 
Ligao was named after the word "ticau", an abundant tree which has poisonous trees used to catch fishes from rivers and creeks. It was formerly known as Cavasi.

History 
During the 16th century, Ligao was started as a small settlement. In 1606, it was founded as a barrio of Polangui, and then to Oas in 1665. One year later, in 1666, it became an independent municipality.

Cityhood 

On January 2, 1997, Mayor Fernando V. Gonzalez's efforts has made possible the cityhood of Ligao. Four years later, President Gloria Macapagal Arroyo signed Republic Act 9008 on February 21, 2001, making it as the sixth city in the Bicol Region. It was ratified by majority of voters in a plebiscite on March 24 of this year.

Geography

Barangays 
Ligao City is politically subdivided into 55 barangays. There are 11 urban and 44 rural barangays, of which 3 are coastal barangays.

Local Government

As of May 2022.

Mayor: Fernando Vallejo Gonzalez

Vice Mayor: Jaypee David

City Councilors:

1. Albert Bichara

2. Amado Manlangit

3. Ana Manlangit

4. Sherwin Quising

7. Jurlan Buello

8. Manny Ribaya

9. Steve Gonzales

10. Phia Monasterial

Climate 

The area of Ligao belongs to a combination of Types II and IV climate, and these are characterized by rainy season from July to December and dry season from January to June.

Local government 
These are the elected local officials as of May 2022.

Mayor: Fernando Vallejo Gonzalez

Vice Mayor: Jaypee David

City Councilors:

1. Albert Bichara

2. Amado Manlangit

3. Ana Manlangit

4. Sherwin Quising

5. Ted Residilla

6. Felipe Alday

7. Jurlan Buello

8. Manny Ribaya

9. Steve Gonzales

10. Phia Monasterial

Demographics

Economy 
As of May 2022, there are 2 major banks in operation. Landbank and Metrobank.

BPI Direct BanKo also opened one of their branches here last 2019.

Several famous fast food chains have also opened such as Jollibee, McDonald's and Mang Inasal.

A local Mall Chain, LCC Malls, opened one of their branches here last December 2013.

Education
Ligao City is home to several public and private schools.

Elementary Schools

High Schools:
Bacong National HS
Barayong National HS
Bicol Regional Science HS
Cabarian National HS
Deogracias P. Princesa Memorial High School
Ligao City National Technical Vocational HS
Ligao National High School
Moonon NHS(Cabarian HS Extension)
Oma-oma National HS
Palapas National HS
Paulba National HS

Private Schools:
Aletheia Christian Academy of Ligao Inc.
Arise and Shine Christian School of Ligao, Inc.
Cornerstone Development Center for Children Inc.
Fishermen of Christ Learning Center-Ligao
Holy Trinity Foundation Learning School
Kinder Home Learning Center
Ligao Adventist Elementary School Inc.
Ma. Cecilia Montessori School
Mayon Institute of Science and Technology
Nazarene Kindergarten School
One Asia Kids Academy
Our Children Montessori Foundation Inc.
St. Mary's Academy of Ligao
Vanderpol Christian Academy,Inc.

Tertiary Level
Ligao Community College (LiComCo)
Infotech Development System Colleges 
RENET Technological College and the Computer Arts Technology
Computer Arts and Technological College (CAT College)

Gallery

References

External links

 [ Philippine Standard Geographic Code]
 

Cities in Albay
Populated places established in 1666
1666 establishments in the Philippines
Component cities in the Philippines